Nordin is a masculine given name that may refer to the following people:
 Nordin Amrabat (born 1987), Dutch-born Moroccan Rifian footballer
Nordin Bakker (born 1997), Dutch football player
Nordin ben Salah (1972–2004), Dutch boxer and kickboxer
Nordin Gerzić (born 1983), Bosnian-Herzegovinian-born Swedish footballer
Nordin Jackers (born 1997), Belgian football goalkeeper 
Nordin Jbari (born 1975), Belgian football player of Moroccan descent
Nordin Mohamed Jadi (born 1962), Malaysian track runner
Nordin Musampa (born 2001), Dutch football defender
Nordin Wooter (born 1976), Dutch footballer of Surinamese descent